"Highland Cathedral" is a popular melody for the Great Highland Bagpipe.

This melody was composed by German musicians Ulrich Roever and Michael Korb in 1982 for a Highland games held in Germany. It has been proposed as the Scottish national anthem to replace unofficial anthems "Scotland the Brave" and/or "Flower of Scotland". It has subsequently undergone various orchestrations and had lyrics added in English and in Scottish Gaelic.

The tune was the Royal Hong Kong Police Anthem under British rule which ended in 1997. It was played at a ceremonial lowering of the Governor's flag at Chris Patten's official residence, Government House in Central, on the last day of British rule. "Highland Cathedral" is Patten's favourite pipe tune, as said by himself on a BBC Asia Today programme.

The tune has been performed by the Royal Scots Dragoon Guards, and featured in the album, Spirit of the Glen, which won a Classical Brit award in 2009. The song has been performed at numerous Scottish cultural events, including Scotland's Rugby Union games.  It is also a popular wedding song.

It was played on 4 May 2019 at the State funeral of the Grand Duke Jean from Luxembourg at the Notre Dame Cathedral by the Band of the Irish Guards and the Luxembourg Military Band.

Lyrics

The lyrics were written by Ben Kelly in 1990 and registered with PRS and MCPS.

References

External links
 http://www.highlandcathedral.com

Scottish patriotic songs
Scottish songs
1982 compositions
Compositions for bagpipe